Keith Beauchamp (born 20 December 1967) is an Australian former professional rugby league footballer who played in the 1990s.

He played for the Illawarra Steelers from 1990 to 1991 and 1994 to 1995, then the Newcastle Knights in 1996 and finally the Hunter Mariners in 1997.  Beauchamp played in the Hunter Mariners final ever game as a club, the 1997 World Club Championship final against Brisbane which they lost 36-12.

References

External links
http://www.rugbyleagueproject.org/players/Keith_Beauchamp/summary.html

1967 births
Living people
Australian rugby league players
Hunter Mariners players
Illawarra Steelers players
Newcastle Knights players
Place of birth missing (living people)
Rugby league wingers